Magness-Humphries House is a historic home and farm located near Gaffney, Cherokee County, South Carolina. It was built in 1904, and is a two-story, frame  Queen Anne / Classical Revival style farmhouse on brick and rock piers. It features a steep hipped roof and decorative chimneys. The property includes a barn, smoke house/potato house, and gear room.  They date to 1871. Other outbuildings include a chicken/hen house built about 1918, a dibby house and pump house built in the 1940s, and several others built in the 1950s.  James Judson Magness established a home and farm in 1871; his original home was destroyed by fire in 1904.

It was listed in the National Register of Historic Places in 2001.

References

Houses on the National Register of Historic Places in South Carolina
Queen Anne architecture in South Carolina
Neoclassical architecture in South Carolina
Houses completed in 1904
Houses in Cherokee County, South Carolina
National Register of Historic Places in Cherokee County, South Carolina